Wood Bay is a large bay which is bounded by Cape Johnson and Aviator Glacier Tongue on the north, and Cape Washington on the south, along the coast of Victoria Land, Antarctica. It was discovered in 1841 by Captain James Clark Ross, Royal Navy, and named by him for Lieutenant James F.L. Wood of the ship HMS Erebus.

References

Bays of Victoria Land
Borchgrevink Coast